Just Say Goodbye may refer to:

 A 1966 song by Petula Clark from My Love
 A 1998 song by Ricky Van Shelton from Making Plans
 A 2001 song written for the movie Turning Paige by Michael Shields
 A 2016 song by Wilco on their album Schmilco